Bulldog Drummond Strikes Back is a 1934 American comedy-mystery-adventure film directed by Roy Del Ruth. The film stars Ronald Colman and Loretta Young. It was a loose sequel to the 1929 film Bulldog Drummond which had also starred Colman.

Plot
Bulldog Drummond's partner Algy is set to wed. Bulldog attends the wedding but on his return home in the deep foggy night he wanders into an old mansion of Prince Achmed in search of a telephone. To his shock he finds the corpse of an old man. Bodies keep disappearing as Drummond attempts to contact the authorities, including neighbour Captain Nielsen. But a woman is on the case, Lola, who is the daughter of the dead man.

Cast
 Ronald Colman as Capt. Hugh (Bulldog) Drummond
 Loretta Young as Lola Field
 C. Aubrey Smith as Captain Reginald Neilsen a.k.a. Colonel
 Charles Butterworth as Algy a.k.a. Mousey
 Una Merkel as Gwen
 Warner Oland as Prince Achmed
 E.E. Clive as London Bobbie
 Mischa Auer as Hassan
 Douglas Gerrard as Parker, Drummond's Valet
 Ethel Griffies as Mrs. Field
 Halliwell Hobbes as Bobby
 Arthur Hohl as Dr. Sothern
 George Regas as Singh
 Olaf Hytten as Hotel Clerk (uncredited)
 Ronnie Coleman as extra
 Billy Bevan as Man In Hotel
 H. N. Clugston as Mr. Field 
 Halliwell Hobbes as Second Bobbie

See also
 List of American films of 1934
 Bulldog Drummond

External links
 
 
 
 

Films based on Bulldog Drummond
1934 films
American adventure comedy films
American comedy mystery films
1930s English-language films
1930s adventure comedy films
American black-and-white films
Films directed by Roy Del Ruth
Films produced by Darryl F. Zanuck
Films scored by Alfred Newman
Films with screenplays by Nunnally Johnson
1930s comedy mystery films
Twentieth Century Pictures films
United Artists films
1934 comedy films
1930s American films